Oquossoc is an unincorporated village in the town of Rangeley, Franklin County, Maine, United States. The community is located at the junction of Maine State Route 4 and Maine State Route 17 at the northwest tip of Rangeley Lake. Oquossoc has a post office with ZIP code 04964, which opened on December 17, 1902.

References

Villages in Franklin County, Maine
Villages in Maine